Hornedjitef was an  ancient Egyptian  priest in the Temple of Amun at Karnak during the reign of Ptolemy III (246–222 BC).  He is known from his elaborate coffins, mummy mask and mummy, dating from the Early Ptolemaic Period (around 220 BC) and excavated from Asasif, Thebes, Egypt, which are all held in the British Museum.  These related objects were chosen as the first of the hundred objects selected by British Museum Director Neil MacGregor in the 2010 BBC Radio 4 series A History of the World in 100 Objects.

Along with his coffins, mummy-case, mummy-mask and mummy, Hornedjitef's tomb contained items such as a papyrus Book of the Dead and a painted wooden figure of Ptah-Sokar-Osiris.

Reading
Mack, J. (ed.), Masks: the art of expression London: The British Museum Press, 1994
Strudwick, Nigel, Masterpieces of Ancient Egypt, London: British Museum Publications, 2006 
Walker, S. and Bierbrier, M., Ancient faces: mummy portraits London: The British Museum Press, 1997

References

External links

Outer coffin of Hornedjitef in the British Museum
Outer coffin of Hornedjitef in the British Museum - detailed database entry
Inner coffin and mummy of Hornedjitef in the British Museum
Mummy mask of Hornedjitef in the British Museum
Inner coffin of Hornedjitef in the British Museum detailed database entry
Mummy-mask / mummy-case / cartonnage / anklet / human mummy of Hornedjitef in the British Museum detailed database entry
 Painted wooden figure of Ptah-Sokar-Osiris from the burial of Hornedjitef.  British Museum
Book of the Dead of Hornedjitef, papyrus sheet 1 of 8
"Restoring the mummy and cartonnage case of Hornedjitef" British Museum
BBC Radio 4 A History of the World in 100 Objects website page on Hornedjitef

Ancient Egyptian objects in the British Museum
Sculptures of ancient Egypt
3rd-century BC works
Ancient Egyptian priests
Ancient Egyptian mummies